Goobertown is an unincorporated community in Craighead County, Arkansas, United States.

References

Unincorporated communities in Craighead County, Arkansas
Unincorporated communities in Arkansas